Santa Bárbara is one of the 13 municipalities of the state of Monagas, Venezuela. The municipality's capital is Santa Bárbara.

History 
On december 2021, Carmen Tillero was elected mayor of the municipality.

Geography 
The municipality Santa Bárbara is located to the west of the Monagas State. Has a tropical dry forest vegetation and another tropical humid forest, has an average annual temperature of 26.8 °C and rainfall of 1,092 mm (annual average).

Economy 
The economy is farm, among the main crops are sugarcane, cotton, maize, soy and sorghum.

Culture

Public holidays 
In December, they hold in honor of the patron of the municipality, Santa Barbara.

Mayor 
 José Malavé (2013—2017)(2017-2021). PSUV.
 Carmen Tillero (2021—2025). PSUV.

References

Municipalities of Monagas